John Fletcher Hargrave  (28 December 1815 – 23 February 1885) was a British-born Australian politician and judge.

Hargrave was born to Joshua Hargrave and Sarah Hargrave (née Lee) at Greenwich, England. His father was a hardware merchant. He was educated at King's College, London in 1830 winning a certificate of honour for rhetoric. He went on to Trinity College, Cambridge and was awarded a Bachelor of Arts in 1837 and a Masters of Arts in 1840. He enrolled at Lincoln's Inn and was called to the Bar in 1841.

He married his cousin Ann Hargrave on 20 September 1843. They were to have three sons and a daughter. He retired from the bar in 1851 and some time after was committed to an asylum at Colney Hatch in Middlesex by his wife and he gradually recovered there. He never forgave his wife for this.

He migrated to Sydney, New South Wales in February 1857. He was admitted to the New South Wales bar on his arrival and became a judge of the District Court. His wife returned to England because he could not endure her presence. He resigned from the bench in February 1859 as his judgeship was "disastrous for women suitors" as he regularly decided against them.

Following his resignation, he was appointed Solicitor General for New South Wales on 21 February 1859 in the second Cowper ministry and held that appointment until 26 October of that year. He was not a member of parliament at the time he was appointed Solicitor General and Robert Owen, the member for East Camden, was appointed to the District Court to replace Hargrave, and Hargrave in turn replaced Owen as the member for East Camden at the resulting by-election. East Camden was abolished in 1859, partly replaced by Illawarra, and Hargrave was successful at the election on 15 June, but only served until 11 October 1859, when he resigned to accept an appointment to the Legislative Council.

On 12 October 1859 he was appointed to the Legislative Council, filling the vacant role of Representative of the Government in the Legislative Council. When the second Cowper ministry resigned, Hargreave was reappointed Solicitor General in the Forster ministry on 3 November and held it till 8 March 1860. He was appointed Attorney General in the first Robertson ministry from 2 April 1860, retaining the position in the third Cowper ministry until 31 July 1863. Hargreave controversially accepted the lesser role of Solicitor General to allow John Darvall to be appointed Attorney General. He was appointed Queen's Counsel on 7 August 1863. Hargreave was Solicitor General from 1 August 1863 and 15 October 1863 and again in the fourth Cowper ministry from 3 February until 21 June 1865. Hargreave resigned from the Legislative Council on 23 June 1865.

In Parliament he was on the:

Standing Orders Committee,
Elections and Qualifications Committee,
Burwood Tramroad Continuation Act Amendment Bill Committee,
Late Shipwrecks Committee
Port Jackson Committee; and
the Australian Agricultural Company's Newcastle Railway Bill Committee.

He was appointed a judge of the Supreme Court of New South Wales on 22 June 1865 but his swearing-in was boycotted by the New South Wales Bar. He was the Judge in divorce appointed to the Divorce Division of the Court. He proved to be a disaster on the bench and he admitted that he did not sit before 11am or work after 1pm. He retired as a judge in 1881.

He became reader in general jurisprudence at the University of Sydney and gave his first lecture on 3 August 1858. His course of twenty lectures were published in 1878.

His wife Ann died on the North Shore on 29 October 1885 (aged 66).

His brother Richard Hargrave also served in the New South Wales Parliament after arriving in New South Wales in 1838. His son Lawrence Hargrave was the inventor of the box or cellular kite. Hargrave's great, great nephew Rick Colless was a member of the Legislative Council.

References

 

1815 births
1885 deaths
Members of the New South Wales Legislative Assembly
Members of the New South Wales Legislative Council
Judges of the Supreme Court of New South Wales
Australian barristers
Alumni of King's College London
Alumni of Trinity College, Cambridge
Australian King's Counsel
Attorneys General of the Colony of New South Wales
Solicitors General for New South Wales
Colony of New South Wales judges
19th-century Australian politicians
19th-century Australian judges
Judges of the District Court of NSW